Balkar Singh Sidhu (born 10 October 1971) is an Indian politician and Punjabi singer. He is the Member of legislative assembly from the Rampura Phul Assembly constituency and a member of the Aam Aadmi Party.

Early life and career

Balkar Sidhu was born on 10 October 1971, to father S. Roop Singh Sidhu and mother Charanjeet Kaur, in the village of Poohla of Bathinda district in Punjab. He is married to Jinder Kaur and has two daughters and one son. He is the three-times university gold medalist in singing and learned music from the famous Dhadi singer Gurbakhsh Singh Albela (his uncle) as professional.

Politics
In May 2014, he joined Aam Aadmi Party. He was nominated AAP candidate from Talwandi Sabo Assembly constituency in 2014 Punjab by-elections. Later he was replaced by another candidate Baljinder Kaur. Sidhu decided to contest elections as independent candidate and was expelled from AAP, although he re-joined The Aam Aadmi Party. 

In 2022 Punjab Assembly elections, Balkar Singh Sidhu won from the Rampura Phul Assembly constituency defeating Shiromani Akali Dal candidate Sikandar Singh Maluka and former Congress MLA Gurpreet Singh Kangar. The Aam Aadmi Party gained a strong 79% majority in the sixteenth Punjab Legislative Assembly by winning 92 out of 117 seats in the 2022 Punjab Legislative Assembly election. MP Bhagwant Mann was sworn in as Chief Minister on 16 March 2022.

Member of Legislative Assembly
He represents the Rampura Phul Assembly constituency as MLA in Punjab Assembly.

Committee assignments of Punjab Legislative Assembly
Member (2022–23) Committee on Estimates
Member (2022–23) Committee on Government Assurances

Discography

His first Punjabi music album was Karna Chhad De Pyar, released during his graduation's first year. Later he released  Din Pepran De and other albums.

His latest single track release was "Jatt Pateya Gya" composed and directed by Studio Nasha. Some of his albums are:

 Din Pepran/Paperan de
 Hasdian De Ghar Vasde
 Gall Taan Bandee
 Aaja Ganne Chupiye
 Tu Meri Khand Mishri
 Do Gallan
 Charkhe
 Laung Taviteriaan
 Mehndi
 Phulkari
 Chubare Wali Baari
 Saada Vee Viyah Ho Gayan

Electoral performance

References

External links
 https://web.archive.org/web/20170118030102/http://desimunde.net/

Punjabi-language singers
Living people
Punjabi people
1973 births
People from Bathinda district
Punjab, India MLAs 2022–2027
Aam Aadmi Party politicians from Punjab, India